Mehdi Rajabzadeh (born June 21, 1978) is a retired Iranian footballer who last played for Zob Ahan and Mes kerman Rajabzadeh played as a midfielder and is the second-top scorer in the history of the Persian Gulf Pro League.

Club career
Rajabzadeh started his career at Fajr Sepasi where he impressed enough to be transferred to Zob Ahan FC in 2003. During the 2006/07 season Rajabzadeh became the top goalscorer by scoring 17 goals. He is one of the top all time IPL goalscorers.

Club career statistics

 Assist Goals

International career
He made his debut for Iran against Qatar in February 2004. In October 2006, he joined Team Melli in an LG cup tournament held in Jordan. He scored his first goal for Iran on October 4, 2006 in a match against Iraq.

As of February 2008, he has 17 caps and 4 goals for Iran.

International goals

Scores and results list Iran's goal tally first.

The second-top scorer in the Iranian Premier League 
Mehdi Rajabzadeh is the second-top scorer in the history of this competition after Gholamreza Enayati, scoring 116 goals with the shirts of Fajr Sepasi Shiraz, Zobahan Isfahan and Mes Kerman in the Premier League.

Honours
Fajr Sepasi
 Hazfi Cup (1): 2000-01, 2001-02 Runner up, 2002-03 Runner up
Zob Ahan
AFC Champions League: 2010 Runner up
Iran Pro League: 2004–05 Runner up
Hazfi Cup (2): 2014–15, 2015–16
Iranian Super Cup (1): 2016
Iran National Team
 WAFF Championship (1): 2007
 LG Cup (1): 2006

Individual 
 Iran Pro League Top Goalscorer: 2006–07 (17 Goals)
Top scorer in Iran Pro League: 116 goals

References 

 رجب‌زاده: زمانی ذوب‌آهن به بارسلونای کوچک معروف بود/ در مورد پرسپولیس و آل‌کثیر حرفی نزدم Retrieved in Persian www.farsnews.ir خبرگزاری فارس 
 رجب‌زاده: عملکرد هر سرمربی از نتایج تیمش مشخص است/ ذوب‌آهن نباید به‌راحتی امتیاز از دست دهد Retrieved in Persian www.tasnimnews.com خبرگزاری تسنیم 
مهدی رجب زاده رسما مربی ذوب آهن شد Retrieved in Persian www.mehrnews.com خبرگزاری مهر 
رجب زاده در کنار ژاوی قرار گرفت (عکس) Retrieved in Persian www.varzesh3.com ورزش سه
Biography Mehdi Rajabzadeh Retrieved in Persian    
نام کاپیتان سابق ذوب آهن در تقویم AFC ثبت شد Retrieved in Persian www.imna.ir خبرگزاری ایمنا
رجب‌زاده: آن‌قدر کارایی فنی دارم که در لیگ برتر کار کنم/ ذوب‌آهن به اصلاح نیاز دارد Retrieved in Persian www.isna.ir news خبرگزاری دانشجویان ایران ایسنا
اقدام جالب توجه ذوب آهن ؛ پیراهن مهدی رجب زاده بایگانی شد Retrieved in Persian www.ilna.news خبرگزاری ایلنا 
Seongnam vs. Zob Ahan Retrieved Soccerway 13 November 2010

External links

 Mehdi Rajabzadeh at PersianLeague.com
 
Mehdi Rajabzadeh at National-Football-Teams.com
 Mehdi Rajabzadeh at FootballDatabase.eu
 
 

1978 births
Living people
Iranian footballers
Iran international footballers
Association football forwards
Fajr Sepasi players
Zob Ahan Esfahan F.C. players
Sanat Mes Kerman F.C. players
Iranian expatriate footballers
People from Shiraz
Emirates Club players
Al Dhafra FC players
2007 AFC Asian Cup players
UAE Pro League players
People from Kazerun
Sportspeople from Fars province